American deathcore band Suicide Silence has released seven studio albums, three EPs, twenty-three singles, nineteen music videos, three demo albums, and one video album.

Studio albums

Extended plays

Video albums

Demos

Singles

Promotional singles

References

External links
 

Suicide Silence discography at AllMusic
Suicide Silence discography at Discogs
Suicide Silence discography at MusicBrainz

Discographies of American artists
Heavy metal group discographies